Daniel Guitard (born 1 October 1959) is a Canadian politician, who is the mayor-elect of Belle-Baie, New Brunswick, and was formerly Speaker of the Legislative Assembly of New Brunswick. He was first elected to the Legislative Assembly of New Brunswick in the 2014 provincial election. He represented the electoral district of Restigouche-Chaleur as a member of the Liberal Party. On October 23, 2018, members of the assembly selected Guitard to serve as Speaker of the Legislative Assembly of New Brunswick. On October 11, 2022, he announced his resignation due to his plans to run for mayor of the newly-created municipality of Belle-Baie. He would end up being successful. He was previously mayor of Pointe-Verte, New Brunswick.

He was born in Pointe-Verte, New Brunswick.

References

Living people
New Brunswick Liberal Association MLAs
People from Restigouche County, New Brunswick
21st-century Canadian politicians
1959 births
Mayors of places in New Brunswick
Speakers of the Legislative Assembly of New Brunswick